Al-Hilal al-Sahili is a Yemeni football club based in Al Hudaydah, Yemen.  The club was founded in 1971.

Achievements
Yemeni League
 Champions (2): 2008, 2009
Yemeni President Cup
 Champions (2): 2005, 2008
Yemeni September 26 Cup
 Champions (1): 2003

Performance in AFC competitions
AFC Cup: 3 appearances
2007: Group Stage
2009: Group Stage
2010: Group Stage

Current squad

Managerial history
Last update: 21 February 2014.
 Sami Al Nash (ca. 2010)
 Mehdi Mahdawi (20??–14)
 Sami Al Nash (2014–)

References

Football clubs in Yemen
Association football clubs established in 1971
1971 establishments in North Yemen